The 5th Korfball World Championship was held in New Delhi (India) in November 1995, with the participation of 12 national teams.

First round

Intermediate round
Teams finishing second and third in the group stage had to play the intermediate round to determine whether they qualified for the quarter finals, or had to play the 9-12th place playoff.

Final round

Final ranking

See also
Korfball World Championship
International Korfball Federation

External links
International Korfball Federation

Korfball World Championship
IKF World Korfball Championship
1995 in Indian sport
Sport in New Delhi
1990s in Delhi
Korfball in India